GobbleHoof were an American rock band from AmherstMassachusetts founded in 1990. The group was led by Charlie Nakajima, previously of Deep Wound.

Discography
Gobble Hoof mini LP 1990
"Headbanger", single 1992
Freezer Burn, album 1993

References

Rock music groups from Massachusetts